"The World Is Ours Tonight" is a song recorded by American country music group Gloriana for the 2010 Winter Olympics. Written by Jess Cates, Lindy Robbins and the band's producer, Matt Serletic, it was issued as a single in March 2010. All proceeds from the single went to Team USA.

The song debuted on the country music charts in March 2010, peaking at #37. It was also added to a March 2010 reissue of the band's self-titled debut album.

Critical reception
Blake Boldt of Engine 145 gave the song a "thumbs-down" rating, saying that Matt Serletic's production "do[es] them few favors." Laurie Petricka of Roughstock stated the song "allows the group to showcase their unique blend of classic country with just the right touch of modern style."

Music video

Shawn Robbins directed the song's music video.

Chart performance
"The World Is Ours Tonight" debuted at number 51 on the Billboard Hot Country Songs chart in March 2010. It spent nine weeks on the chart, it was a minor Top 40 peaking at number 37 becoming their third Top 40.

References

2010 singles
2010 songs
Gloriana (band) songs
Songs written by Matt Serletic
Songs written by Jess Cates
Songs written by Lindy Robbins
Song recordings produced by Matt Serletic
Reprise Records singles
Warner Records singles